Brockroad is an unincorporated community named after a local road in Spotsylvania County, Virginia, in the United States.

Geography
Brockroad is not an urban center and thus has no major shopping centers. The town lies within the Piedmont region of Virginia.

History
The Brockroad area was the location of many battles fought during the American Civil War, including the battles of Battle of Chancellorsville and The Wilderness.

Brock Road Station on the Potomac, Fredericksburg and Piedmont Railroad was situated on Brock Road at latitude 38°16′28″ north and longitude 77° 40′ 45″ west.  The Railroad crossed Brock Road about half a mile south east of the modern Brock Road Elementary School.

References

External links
Spotsylvania County website
Pictures of Brock Road (Flickr)

Unincorporated communities in Spotsylvania County, Virginia
Unincorporated communities in Virginia